Ahqaf al Jabhiya  is a city in Libya. It is a suburb located about 3.5km south of Bayda, Libya.

References

External links
Satellite map at Maplandia.com

Basic People's Congress divisions of Bayda
Populated places in Jabal al Akhdar